Evan Ravenel (born November 24, 1989), nicknamed E,  is an American professional basketball player for Altiri Chiba of the B3 League.

College career
He began his collegiate career at Boston College, and was transferred to  the Ohio State Buckeyes. He helped the OSU advance to the NCAA Final Four as a college junior.

Professional career
Ravenel played for the Ryukyu Golden Kings of Okinawa in 2015-16. The team won that season's bj league championship title and Ravenel was awarded playoff MVP.

On January 16, 2017, he signed with the Akita Northern Happinets of B.League. In 2017-18, he played for BC Rilski Sportist in Bulgaria and posted 11.4 points and 5.6 rebounds per game. Ravenel signed with the Fukushima Firebonds of the B.League on August 15, 2018.

Personal
Evan and his younger sister Erin are the children of Pamela and Eugene Ravenel.

College statistics

|-
| align="left" | 2008-09
| align="left" | Boston College
| 14 || 0 || 10.3 || 32.1 || - || 58.8 || 1.36 || 0.36 || 0.21 || 0.57 || 2.00
|-
| align="left" | 2009-10
| align="left" | Boston College
| 25 || 0 || 10.5 || 49.2 || - || 71.4 || 2.44 || 0.40 || 0.08 || 0.36 ||  3.28
|-
| align="left" | 2010-11
| align="left" | Ohio State
| ||  ||  ||  ||  ||  ||  ||  ||  ||  ||   
|-
| align="left" | 2011-12
| align="left" | Ohio State
| 39 || 4 || 10.2 || 54.1 || - || 69.5 || 2.15 || 0.26 || 0.26 || 0.23 ||  3.41
|-
| align="left" | 2012-13
| align="left" | Ohio State
| 37 || 12 || 16.8 || 51.4 || 0.00 || 64.9 || 4.16 || 0.32 || 0.35 || 0.73 ||  4.89
|-
|- class="sortbottom"
! style="text-align:center;" colspan=2| Career 
! 115 ||16  || 12.4 || .500 || .000 || .671 || 2.77 || 0.32|| 0.24 ||0.46 || 3.69
|-

Career statistics

NBA Preseason Stats 

|-
| align="left" | 2016-17
| align="left" | Maccabi Haifa
| 1 || 0 || 16.2 || .500 || .500 || .500 || 2.00 || 1.00 || 0.00 || 0.00 ||  6.00
|-

Regular season 

|-
| align="left" | 2013-14
| align="left" | Rilski Sportist
| 32 || 31 || 26.3 || 50.5 || 28.6 || 71.3 || 7.06 || 1.62 || 0.88 || 0.78 ||  13.12
|-
| align="left" | 2014-15
| align="left" | Polpharma Starogard Gdanski
| 12 || 12 || 30.3 || 50.7 || 26.9 || 82.7 || 9.33 || 0.92 || 1.00 || 0.25 ||  18.50
|-
|  align="left"  style="background-color:#afe6ba; border: 1px solid gray" | 2015-16†
| align="left" | Ryukyu
| 50 || 50 || 27.2 || 58.8 || 20.0 || 81.3 || 10.5 || 1.7 || 0.9 || 0.4 ||  17.3
|-
| align="left" | 2016-17
| align="left" | Liège
| 4 || 3 || 21.8 || 41.0 || 20.0 || 80.0 || 3.75 || 0.75 || 0.50 || 0.00 ||  11.25
|-
|style="background-color:#FFCCCC"  align="left" | 2016-17
| align="left" | Akita
|31 || 5 ||18.8  || 40.8 ||22.0  ||79.1  ||5.4  || 1.7 || 0.4 || 0.2 || 8.7
|-
|  align="left" | 2017-18
| align="left" | Rilski Sportist
|36 || 8 ||19.7  || 60.6 ||26.5  ||75.7  ||5.47  || 1.47 || 0.67 || 0.14 || 11.75
|-
|  align="left" | 2018-19
| align="left" | Fukushima
|55 || 55 ||28.14  || 53.8 ||33.5  ||80.3  ||9.0  || 2.9 || 0.98 || 0.38 || 21.9
|-

Playoffs 

|-
|style="text-align:left;"|2013-14
|style="text-align:left;"|Rilski 
| 2 ||   ||24.0 || .524   || .000 || .667 ||3.5 ||1.0 || 0.5|| 0.0 ||14.0
|-
|style="text-align:left;"|2015-16
|style="text-align:left;"|Ryukyu
| 6 || 6 ||25.67 || .364   || 1.000 || .769 ||10.67 ||1.33 || 0.83|| 0 ||14.17
|-
|style="text-align:left;"|2016-17
|style="text-align:left;"|Akita
| 3 || 0 || 9.22 || .538 || .000 || .500 || 2.3 || 0.3 || 0 || 0 || 5.3
|-
|style="text-align:left;"|2017-18
|style="text-align:left;"|Rilski 
| 8 || 0 || 20.3 || .526 || .100 || .737 || 5.6 || 0.6 || 0.6 || 1.1 || 9.4
|-

Early cup games 

|-
|style="text-align:left;"|2018
|style="text-align:left;"|Fukushima
| 2 || 2 || 28.14 || .536 || .400 || 1.000 || 8.0 || 4.0 || 1.0 || 0.5 ||18.0
|-

References

External links 

 
 Ohio State Buckeyes bio

1989 births
Living people
Akita Northern Happinets players
Altiri Chiba players
American expatriate basketball people in Belgium
American expatriate basketball people in Bulgaria
American expatriate basketball people in Israel
American expatriate basketball people in Japan
American expatriate basketball people in Poland
American men's basketball players
Basketball players from Tampa, Florida
BC Rilski Sportist players
Boston College Eagles men's basketball players
Fukushima Firebonds players
Kumamoto Volters players
Liège Basket players
Ohio State Buckeyes men's basketball players
Power forwards (basketball)
Ryukyu Golden Kings players